Immetalia is a genus of moths of the family Noctuidae. The genus was erected by Karl Jordan in 1896.

Species
Immetalia bernsteinii (Vollenhoven, 1863) Gilolo, Morotai, Batchian, Buru
Immetalia celebensis Rothschild, 1896 southern Sulawesi
Immetalia cyanea Rothschild, 1896 New Guinea
Immetalia eichhorni Rothschild & Jordan, 1901 Solomon Islands
Immetalia longipalpis (Kirsch, 1877) New Guinea, New Ireland
Immetalia meeki Rothschild, 1896 Louisidade, Goodenough Island, D'Entrecasteaui Islands, Fergusson Island
Immetalia mokndoma de Vos, 2013 New Guinea
Immetalia saturata (Walker, [1865]) Buru, New Guinea

References

Agaristinae